Goran Kozomara (born 5 June 1981) is a Slovenian handball player, currently playing for Danish Handball League side AaB Håndbold. Before joining AaB, Kozomara has played for Celje Pivovarna Laško in Slovenia, and for Teka Cantabria in the best league of Spain. 

Kozomara is a regular member of the Slovenian national handball team.

External links
 Player info

1981 births
Living people
Slovenian male handball players
Aalborg Håndbold players